The  2010 Big 12 Championship Game was a college football game played on Saturday, December 4, 2010, at Cowboys Stadium in Arlington. This was the 15th Big 12 Championship Game and determined the 2010 champion of the Big 12 Conference. The game featured the Nebraska Cornhuskers, champions of the North division, and the Oklahoma Sooners, champions of the South division. Sponsored by soft drink brand Dr Pepper, the game is officially known as the Dr Pepper Big 12 Championship Game.

Previous season
The 2009 Big 12 Championship Game featured Nebraska, champions of the North division against Texas, champions of the South division. The game was the third championship tilt between the Cornhuskers and Longhorns. Unranked Texas upset No. 3 Nebraska 37–27 in the inaugural Big 12 title game in St. Louis, while No. 2 Nebraska beat No. 12 Texas 22–6 in 1999 in San Antonio. Texas was victorious by a score of 13–12, winning their third Big 12 Conference championship.

2010 conference realignment impact

From 2009 through 2013, the Big 12 Championship Game was scheduled to be played at the venue now known as AT&T Stadium. During June 2010, however, Nebraska and Colorado announced that they would leave the Big 12 for other conferences in 2011. Because then-current NCAA rules required that a conference have 12 members in order to stage a football championship game that was exempt from the organization's limits on regular-season games, it was announced on September 30, 2010, that the Big 12 would no longer have a conference championship game, starting with the 2011 football season.

Teams

Nebraska

Oklahoma

Game summary

Statistics

Return of championship game in 2017
Following a January 2016 NCAA rule change that allows FBS conferences to conduct football championship games regardless of their membership numbers, the Big 12 announced that the championship game would be reinstated in 2017.

References

External links
 Game statistics at huskermax.com

Big 12 Championship Game
Big 12 Championship Game
Nebraska Cornhuskers football games
Oklahoma Sooners football games
American football in the Dallas–Fort Worth metroplex
Big 12 Championship Game
Big 12 Championship Game